The 1925 Major League Baseball season was contested from April 14 to October 15, 1925. The Pittsburgh Pirates and Washington Senators were the regular season champions of the National League and American League, respectively. The Pirates then defeated the Senators in the World Series, four games to three.

This was the fourth of eight seasons that "League Awards", a precursor to the Major League Baseball Most Valuable Player Award (introduced in 1931), were issued.

Awards and honors
League Award
 Roger Peckinpaugh, Washington Senators, SS
 Rogers Hornsby, St. Louis Cardinals, 2B

Statistical leaders

Standings

American League

National League

Postseason

Bracket

Managers

American League

National League

Home Field Attendance

Events 
September 25 – Rogers Hornsby of the St. Louis Cardinals is fined $500 and stood down for the remainder of the season after refusing to take the field against the Brooklyn Robins.

References

External links
1925 Major League Baseball season schedule at Baseball Reference

 
Major League Baseball seasons